Stadion De Vijverberg is the football stadium in Doetinchem, Netherlands. It has a capacity of 12,600 seats.

The name is derived from a hotel with the same name, which stood on the present location of the stadium. Because of all the ponds that had to be filled up, the name Vijverberg arose. The stadium, which was built in 1954, was renovated in 1970, with the construction of the Vijverberg-, Groenendaal- and Spinnenkop stands and the light installation.
After the construction of the roofs above the stands in the late eighties, the radical renovation of the Vijverberg began in the summer of 1998. However, with the positioning of seats on the Spinnekop stand, one of the characteristic parts went lost, so in 2008 De Graafschap decided to remove the seats again.

The stadium used to have its own train station, but it was closed in 2005. The venue opened on 4 September 1954.

References

External links
De Vijverberg at Soccerway

De Graafschap
Football venues in the Netherlands
Sports venues in Gelderland
UEFA Women's Euro 2017 venues